Gordon Wellington "Gord" Fraser (March 3, 1894 – October 1, 1964) was a Canadian professional ice hockey defenceman who played five seasons in the National Hockey League for the Chicago Black Hawks, Detroit Cougars, Montreal Canadiens, Pittsburgh Pirates and Philadelphia Quakers. He won the Stanley Cup in 1925 with the Victoria Cougars, the last non-NHL team to win the Cup.

Fraser died in London, Ontario in 1964 after a long illness at the age of 70. He was buried at Woodland Cemetery of that same city.

Career statistics

Regular season and playoffs

References

External links
 

1894 births
1964 deaths
Calgary Tigers players
Canadian expatriate ice hockey players in the United States
Canadian ice hockey coaches
Canadian ice hockey defencemen
Chicago Blackhawks players
Detroit Cougars players
Detroit Olympics (CPHL) players
Eastern Hockey League coaches
Sportspeople from Pembroke, Ontario
London Tecumsehs players
Montreal Canadiens players
Philadelphia Quakers (NHL) players
Pittsburgh Hornets (IHL) players
Pittsburgh Pirates (IHL) players
Pittsburgh Pirates (NHL) players
Pittsburgh Shamrocks players
Pittsburgh Yellow Jackets (IHL) players
Providence Reds players
Seattle Seahawks (ice hockey) players
Seattle Metropolitans players
Stanley Cup champions
Victoria Cougars (1911–1926) players
Ice hockey people from Ontario